Euphaedra is a butterfly genus in the subfamily Limenitidinae. The species are confined to the Afrotropical realm mainly in the Guinean Forests of West Africa and the Congolian forests.

Description

Euphaedra are large and showy butterflies. They share a common wing shape. On the basal areas of the upperside of the wings (especially the hindwings) are large suffused patches of metallic green, blue, orange or red. Most species also have a cream or orange subapical bar. The undersides are various shades of yellow or green and marked with black streaks and spots. Many species also have pink patches or streaks on the undersides of the hindwings.

The larvae are green, with yellow and pink markings and bear long and branched lateral spines.

Biology
Green species or forms are found in rain forest, yellow species or forms typically occur in drier and often more patchy forests. This is a camouflage adaptation to particular forest light patterns.

The larvae of most species feed on Sapindaceae others on Anacardiaceae, Rutaceae, Sterculiaceae, Annonaceae, Palmae.

Taxonomy

Euphaedra is a species rich genus. In the most recent monograph Jacques Hecq listed 180 species later adding 12. In many species the intraspecific variation is as great or greater than the interspecific variation and the number of species may be smaller.

The species level taxonomy of these polymorphic and also hybridising butterflies is a challenge requiring a synthesis of studies of their evolutionary taxonomy, sympatry and molecular phylogenetics in combination with detailed morphological studies. This is so far only partly achieved.

The type species of the genus is Papilio cyparissa Cramer.

Species groups
Defining species groups is a convenient way of subdividing well-defined genera with a large number of recognized species. Euphaedra species are so arranged in assemblages called "species groups" but (not superspecies, but an informal phenetic arrangement). These may or may not be clades. As molecular phylogenetic studies continue, lineages distinct enough to warrant some formal degree of recognition become evident and new groupings are suggested, but consistent ranking remains a problem.

Species
Listed alphabetically within species groups:
Subgenus Proteuphaedra Hecq, 1976
Euphaedra adolfifrederici Schultze, 1920
Euphaedra aubergeri Hecq, 1977
Euphaedra aurivillii Niepelt, 1914
Euphaedra fucora Hecq, 1979
Euphaedra imperialis Lindemans, 1910
Euphaedra luperca Hewitson, 1864
Euphaedra lupercoides Rothschild, 1918
Euphaedra luteofasciata Hecq, 1979
Euphaedra marginalis Hecq, 1979
Euphaedra rubrocostata (Aurivillius, 1898)
Euphaedra symphona Bethune-Baker, 1908
Subgenus Medoniana Hecq, 1976
Euphaedra medon (Linnaeus, 1763)
Subgenus Gausapia Hecq, 1976
The gausapia species group
Euphaedra calliope Hecq, 1981
Euphaedra clio Hecq, 1981
Euphaedra ducarmei Hecq, 1977
Euphaedra extensa Hecq, 1981
Euphaedra gausape (Butler, [1866])
Euphaedra hastiri Hecq, 1981
Euphaedra judith Weymer, 1892
Euphaedra landbecki Rothschild, 1918
Euphaedra melpomene Hecq, 1981
Euphaedra ombrophila Hecq, 1981
Euphaedra plantroui Hecq, 1981
The zaddachi species group
Euphaedra athena Hecq & Joly, 2003
Euphaedra barnsi Hecq, 1983
Euphaedra christyi Sharpe, 1904
Euphaedra erici Hecq & Joly, 1987
Euphaedra mariaechristinae Hecq & Joly, 2003
Euphaedra mbamou Hecq, 1987
Euphaedra morini Hecq, 1983
Euphaedra pallas Hecq, 2004
Euphaedra thalie Hecq, 1981
Euphaedra zaddachi Dewitz, 1879
Subgenus Xypetana Hecq, 1976
The xypete species group
Euphaedra acuta Hecq, 1977
Euphaedra hebes Hecq, 1980
Euphaedra hewitsoni Hecq, 1974
Euphaedra larseni Hecq, 2005
Euphaedra maxima Holland, 1920
Euphaedra oremansi Hecq, 1996
Euphaedra xypete (Hewitson, 1865)
The dargei species group
Euphaedra acutoides Hecq, 1996
Euphaedra brevis Hecq, 1977
Euphaedra dargei Hecq, 1975
Euphaedra grandis Hecq, 1980
Euphaedra graueri Rothschild, 1918
Euphaedra herberti (Sharpe, 1891)
Euphaedra karschi Bartel, 1905
Euphaedra lata Hecq, 1980
Euphaedra ubangui Hecq, 1974
The sinuosa species group
Euphaedra diffusa Gaede, 1916
Euphaedra hollandi Hecq, 1974
Euphaedra sinuosa Hecq, 1974
The mirabilis species group
Euphaedra ansorgei Rothschild, 1918
Euphaedra caerulescens Grose-Smith, 1890
Euphaedra camiadei Hecq, 2004
Euphaedra crockeri (Butler, 1869)
Euphaedra crossei Sharpe, 1902
Euphaedra cuprea Hecq, 1980
Euphaedra irangi Hecq, 2004
Euphaedra jacqueshecqui Bollino, 1998
Euphaedra mirabilis Hecq, 1980
Euphaedra mondahensis van de Weghe, Oremans & Hecq, 2005
Euphaedra pervaga Hecq, 1996
Euphaedra romboutsi Hecq, 2004
Subgenus Radia Hecq, 1976
Euphaedra eusemoides (Grose-Smith & Kirby, 1889)
Euphaedra imitans Holland, 1893
Subgenus Euphaedra
Euphaedra cyparissa (Cramer, [1775])
Euphaedra sarcoptera (Butler, 1871)
Subgenus Euphaedrana Hecq, 1976
The themis species group
Euphaedra aberrans Staudinger, 1891
Euphaedra adonina (Hewitson, 1865)
Euphaedra apparata Hecq, 1982
Euphaedra appositiva Hecq, 1982
Euphaedra aureola Kirby, 1889
Euphaedra campaspe (C. & R. Felder, [1867])
Euphaedra canui Hecq, 1987
Euphaedra centralis Hecq, 1985
Euphaedra congo Hecq, 1985
Euphaedra controversa Hecq, 1997
Euphaedra eberti Aurivillius, 1896
Euphaedra exerrata Hecq, 1982
Euphaedra janetta (Butler, 1871)
Euphaedra justicia Staudinger, 1886
Euphaedra laboureana Toulgoët, 1957
Euphaedra laguerrei Hecq, 1979
Euphaedra limbourgi Oremans, 2006
Euphaedra minuta Hecq, 1982
Euphaedra modesta Hecq, 1982
Euphaedra permixtum (Butler, 1873)
Euphaedra piriformis Hecq, 1982
Euphaedra splendens Hecq, 1982
Euphaedra stellata Hecq, 1991
Euphaedra temeraria Hecq, 2007
Euphaedra themis (Hübner, [1807])
Euphaedra ueleana Hecq, 1982
Euphaedra uniformis (Neustetter, 1952)
Euphaedra vetusta (Butler, 1871)
Euphaedra viridirupta Hecq, 2007
The ceres species group
Euphaedra afzelii (C. & R. Felder, [1867])
Euphaedra ceres (Fabricius, 1775)
Euphaedra compacta Hecq, 1997
Euphaedra cottoni Sharpe, 1907
Euphaedra dargeana Hecq, 1980
Euphaedra delera Hecq, 1983
Euphaedra demeter Hecq, 1983
Euphaedra densamacula Hecq, 1997
Euphaedra fontainei Hecq, 1977
Euphaedra francina Godart, [1824]
Euphaedra grilloti Hecq, 1983
Euphaedra ignota Hecq, 1996
Euphaedra inanum (Butler, 1873)
Euphaedra intermedia Rebel, 1914
Euphaedra jacksoni Hecq, 1980
Euphaedra jolyana Hecq, 1986
Euphaedra knoopiana Hecq, 1995
Euphaedra luteolucens Hecq, 1995
Euphaedra margaritifera Schultze, 1920
Euphaedra nigrocilia Lathy, 1903
Euphaedra persephona Hecq, 1983
Euphaedra phaethusa (Butler, [1866])
Euphaedra phosphor Joicey & Talbot, 1921
Euphaedra preussiana Gaede, 1916
Euphaedra proserpina Hecq, 1983
Euphaedra ravola (Hewitson, 1866)
Euphaedra regis-leopoldi Hecq, 1996
Euphaedra regularis Hecq, 1983
Euphaedra rezia (Hewitson, 1866)
Euphaedra sarita (Sharpe, 1891)
Euphaedra solida Hecq, 1997
Euphaedra subprotea Hecq, 1986
Euphaedra tenebrosa Hecq, 1983
Euphaedra uganda Aurivillius, 1895
Euphaedra velutina Hecq, 1997
Euphaedra villiersi Condamin, 1964
Euphaedra viridicaerulea Bartel, 1905
Euphaedra wojtusiaki Hecq, 1993
The preussi species group
Euphaedra albofasciata Berger, 1981
Euphaedra bergeri Hecq, 1974
Euphaedra cinnamomea Rothschild, 1918
Euphaedra disjuncta Hecq, 1984
Euphaedra fascinata Hecq, 1984
Euphaedra fulvofasciata Holland, 1920
Euphaedra illustris Talbot, 1927
Euphaedra leloupi Overlaet, 1955
Euphaedra margueriteae Hecq, 1978
Euphaedra mayumbensis Hecq, 1984
Euphaedra miranda Hecq, 1984
Euphaedra neumanni Rothschild, 1902
Euphaedra niveovittata Overlaet, 1955
Euphaedra ochrovirens Hecq, 1984
Euphaedra olivacea Grünberg, 1908
Euphaedra overlaeti Hulstaert, 1926
Euphaedra paradoxa Neave, 1904
Euphaedra preussi Staudinger, 1891
Euphaedra procera Hecq, 1984
Euphaedra subprocera Hecq, 1984
Euphaedra subviridis Holland, 1920
Euphaedra vicina Hecq, 1984
Euphaedra xerophila Hecq, 1974
The eleus species group
Euphaedra alacris Hecq, 1978
Euphaedra amieti Hecq, 1994
Euphaedra asteria Hecq, 1993
Euphaedra bouyeri Hecq, 1993
Euphaedra castanoides Hecq, 1985
Euphaedra cooksoni Druce, 1905
Euphaedra confina Hecq, 1992
Euphaedra coprates (Druce, 1875)
Euphaedra edwardsii (van der Hoeven, 1845)
Euphaedra eleus (Drury, 1782)
Euphaedra ferruginea Staudinger, 1886
Euphaedra hybrida Hecq, 1978
Euphaedra katangensis Talbot, 1927
Euphaedra murphyi Hecq, 1991
Euphaedra nigrobasalis Joicey & Talbot, 1921
Euphaedra ochracea Hecq, 1978
Euphaedra orientalis Rothschild, 1898
Euphaedra perseis (Drury, 1773)
Euphaedra rattrayi Sharpe, 1904
Euphaedra ruspina Hewitson, 1865
Euphaedra sangbae Hecq, 1996
Euphaedra semipreussiana Hecq, 1993
Euphaedra simplex Hecq, 1978
Euphaedra subferruginea Guillaumin, 1976
Euphaedra variabilis Guillaumin, 1976
Euphaedra zampa (Westwood, 1850)
The harpalyce species group
Euphaedra alava Hecq, 2000
Euphaedra alboides Hecq, 1984
Euphaedra alternus van Someren, 1935
Euphaedra dubreka Collins & Larsen, 2005
Euphaedra eupalus (Fabricius, 1781)
Euphaedra harpalyce (Cramer, [1777])
Euphaedra losinga (Hewitson, 1864)
Euphaedra luafa Oremans, 1998
Euphaedra occulta Hecq, 1982
Euphaedra thierrybaulini Oremans, 1999
Euphaedra vandeweghei Hecq, 2004
Species group unknown
Euphaedra normalis Staudinger, 1891
Subgenus Neophronia Hecq, 1985
Euphaedra neophron (Hopffer, 1855)
Subgenus unknown
Euphaedra abri Faravel, 2005
Euphaedra castanea Berger, 1981
Euphaedra cuypersiana Hecq, 2006
Euphaedra mambili Hecq, 2001
Euphaedra opulenta Hecq & Van de Weghe, 2005
Euphaedra rex Stoneham, 1935
Euphaedra sabinae Faravel, 2002
Euphaedra sardetta Berger, 1981
Euphaedra vulnerata Schultze, 1916
Euphaedra wissmanni Niepelt, 1906

References

Seitz, A. Die Gross-Schmetterlinge der Erde 13: Die Afrikanischen Tagfalter. Plate XIII 42 et seq.
Seitz, A. Die Gross-Schmetterlinge der Erde 13: Die Afrikanischen Tagfalter. Text (in German)
van Someren, Victor Gurner Logan; & Rogers, K. (1934) The Butterflies of Kenya and Uganda. II, part 1: Euphaedra. The Journal of the East Africa and Uganda Natural History Society 12, pp. [58-89]

External links

Images representing Euphaedra at Barcodes of Life
Genus Euphaedra at EOL images
Euphaedra types Royal Museum for Central Africa images

 
Nymphalidae genera
Limenitidinae
Taxa named by Jacob Hübner